Martin O. Galaway (December 27, 1862 in Sheboygan Falls, Wisconsin – January 5, 1955 in Sheboygan County, Wisconsin) was a member of the Wisconsin State Assembly. He was elected to the Assembly in 1898 and again in 1900 as a member of the Republican Party.

References

People from Sheboygan Falls, Wisconsin
1862 births
1955 deaths
Republican Party members of the Wisconsin State Assembly